is a video game by Namco USA for the Xbox, GameCube, and PlayStation 2, released in 2002. A version of the game for Microsoft Windows was released in 2004, and an isometric sidescroller was made for the Game Boy Advance in 2005. The game is a sequel to Pac-Man World (1999). The game is a platform game, where the player controls Pac-Man in a 3D platforming environment, though six worlds. In 2005, a sequel, Pac-Man World 3, was released.

Plot 
Hundreds of years ago, the evil ghost king Spooky terrorized Pac-Land and the Pac-People. To stop him, the Great Wizard Pac created a powerful potion to transform five ordinary fruit into magical Golden Fruit. The knight Sir Pac-A-Lot defeated Spooky in battle, and used the Golden Fruit to seal him under a tree in the center of Pac-Village.

In the present day, Blinky, Inky, Pinky and Clyde sneak into Pac-Village at night to cause mischief. They steal the Golden Fruit from the tree, unaware of its purpose, and unwittingly release Spooky, who commands them to aid his plan to eliminate all Pac-People. The ghosts agree and each take one of the Golden Fruit. The next morning, Professor Pac informs Pac-Man of the trouble and asks him to retrieve the stolen Golden Fruit in order to save Pac-Land. Pac-Man travels throughout Pac-Land and across the ocean to Ghost Island, defeating the ghosts and retrieving the Golden Fruit along the way. Pac-Man eventually returns to Pac-Village, where he is ambushed by Spooky. The power of the Golden Fruit transforms Pac-Man into a new golden form, and he defeats Spooky once more, sealing him back beneath the tree. The residents of Pac-Village emerge to congratulate Pac-Man, while his dog Chomp-Chomp overhears the ghosts planning to free Spooky again and chases them out of the village.

Gameplay

Pac-Man World 2 is a 3D platforming game, where the player controls Pac-Man and must navigate him to the end of each level. The player can use multiple abilities; these include the Rev Roll, a move where the player charges forward, which can be used to attack enemies and cross gaps; the Butt-Bounce, which can press switches and attack enemies from above; and a jumping Flip Kick to strike airborne enemies. Each level features Pac-Dots and fruit to collect, which will increase the player's score for the level. Collecting special Power Pellets will also give Pac-Man temporary power-ups. These power-ups can turn Pac-Man into metal, sinking him into water and making him immune to hazards; shrink him, allowing access to certain parts of a level; or temporarily allow him to eat ghost enemies. Pac-Man possesses a health bar with only three segments; if he takes damage after all three segments are depleted, the player will lose a life and be sent back to the previous checkpoint. After completing any non-boss level, the player can choose to replay it in Time Trial mode, challenging the player to reach the end as quickly as possible. During the time trial, fruits and other collectibles in the level are replaced by clocks, which will temporarily stop the timer if collected. If Pac-Man loses a life during the time trial, he must restart the level from the beginning. 

The game features twenty-five levels. These include a tutorial level set in Pac-Man's home of Pac-Village, followed by six different themed areas with four levels each. The last level of each of these areas feature a boss battle with one or more of the primary ghost enemies, who must be defeated to advance. Certain levels feature unique gameplay mechanics. Some equip Pac-Man with ice skates or roller blades, impacting speed and movement. Others feature automatically-scrolling levels set underwater, in which Pac-Man can swim to avoid obstacles or pilot a submarine equipped with torpedoes. Most levels feature one of 16 collectible Galaxian flagships, which will allow Pac-Man to play a bonus maze level, similar in gameplay to Pac-Man (1980). Non-boss levels also feature collectible arcade tokens; eight are hidden in each level, while bonus tokens can be earned by collecting all the fruit and Pac-Dots in a level and completing time trials. By collecting certain numbers of tokens, players can unlock emulated versions of older Pac-Man titles in the Pac-Village arcade, including Pac-Man, Pac-Attack (1993), Pac-Mania (1987), and Ms. Pac-Man (1982). Collecting tokens will also unlock a jukebox, which enables the player to listen to the game's soundtrack, and a concept art gallery. 

The Game Boy Advance version of the game is considerably different from the other versions of the game. It plays from an isometric view, and uses 2D sprites for graphics and a password-based save system. The underwater stages were omitted from this version, while an additional boss was added. In addition, the emulated games are not included.

Subsequent re-releases of the game rebalanced the gameplay to tone down the game's difficulty. For the game's Japanese PlayStation 2 release, further changes were made to reduce difficulty, including shortening certain levels and reducing bosses' health.

Reception

Next Generation ranked it as the fifty-sixth highest-selling game launched for the PlayStation 2, Xbox or GameCube between January, 2000 and July, 2006 in that country. Combined sales of Pac-Man World games released in the 2000s reached 1.8 million units in the United States by July 2006.

The GameCube version of Pac-Man World 2 has an average score of 73.83% on GameRankings. The PlayStation 2 and Xbox versions each have an average score of 68.18% and 67.69% respectively. The Game Boy Advance version have a score of 41.67%. The GameCube version became a Player's Choice title, the PlayStation 2 version became a Greatest Hits title and the Xbox version became a Platinum Hits title. The game also has a score of eight on GameSpot for the PS2 version, a 7.9 for the Gamecube version, and a 7.5 for the Xbox version. The game's camera system received criticism, but the musical score was praised. NGC Magazine gave the game 70% rating giving praise to the level and boss designs although criticizing the poor camera system and the gameplay being similar to the Mario games. Pac-Man World 2 was nominated for GameSpots annual "Best Platformer on Xbox" award, which went to Jet Set Radio Future.

The Player's Choice edition of the GameCube version included Pac-Man Vs. as a bonus pack-in in North America. Also for North America in 2008, Pac-Man World 2, along with Pac-Man World 3 and Pac-Man World Rally, were included in a 3-pack called the Pac-Man Power Pack for the PlayStation 2.

References
Notes

Citations

External links
 

2002 video games
3D platform games
Game Boy Advance games
GameCube games
Pac-Man
PlayStation 2 games
Video games developed in the United Kingdom
Video games developed in the United States
Windows games
Xbox games
Video games scored by David Logan
Full Fat games
Multiplayer and single-player video games